

See also
 List of United States Air Force squadrons
Ground Observer Corps

Ground observer